Heartbeat is Ruby Lin's first album. Lin began a singing career with a five track EP in 1999. It released in Hong Kong first amongst Asian countries. Its first single "Heartbeat" is only one Cantonese song in this album.

Track listing
心跳 Heartbeat (Xin Tiao)
一百八十分鐘零七秒 180 Mins & 7 Secs (Yi Bai Ba Shi Fen Zhong Ling Qi Miao)
笑話 Joke (Xiao Hua)
生死相許 Together In Life & Death (Sheng Xi Xiang Xu)
採心 Harvesting Hearts (Can Xin)

Music video
心跳 Heartbeat (Xin Tiao)
一百八十分鐘零七秒 180 Mins & 7 Secs (Yi Bai Ba Shi Fen Zhong Ling Qi Miao)
笑話 Joke (Xiao Hua)
生死相許 Together In Life & Death (Sheng Xi Xiang Xu)
採心 Harvesting Hearts (Can Xin)

Awards and nominations
Hong Kong Radio Station Awards
Won: Prosperous New Singer Bronze award

Hong Kong TVB Solid Gold Awards
Won: Most Popular New Singer Award

References

External links
6lyrics.com
amw168.com page

1999 albums
Ruby Lin albums